Sven Tumba (born Sven Olof Gunnar Johansson; 28 August 1931 – 1 October 2011) was one of the most prominent Swedish ice hockey players of the 1950s and 1960s. He also represented Sweden in football as well as golf and became Swedish champion in waterskiing.

Johansson first became known as "Tumba" in the 1950s since there were other players with the same last name, and he grew up in the Swedish town of Tumba. In October 1960 he married his wife Mona, and five years later he, along with Mona, legally changed his family name to Tumba.

After his retirement from ice hockey, he became an accomplished golfer, a golf course designer, creator and organizer of golf exhibitions and tournaments, as well as an ambassador for the game of golf, even officially introducing the game of golf to the former Soviet Union.

Ice hockey

Tumba played for the Swedish club Djurgårdens IF from 1950 to 1966, winning eight Swedish Championships and leading the league top goal scorer three years. He had a lengthy international career, playing for Sweden at 14 IIHF World Championships, four Winter Olympics, named best forward at the 1957 and 1962 World Championships and top scorer at the 1964 Winter Olympics. He also captained the national team. Djurgården has retired number 5 in his honor.

Tumba still holds the Swedish scoring record of 186 goals (in 245 games) for the Swedish national team.

In 1997, he was inducted into the IIHF Hall of Fame and was in 1999 awarded the "Best Swedish Ice-hockey Player of All Times", outvoting prominent players such as Peter Forsberg and Mats Sundin.

Tumba was the first European player to attend an NHL training camp, with the Boston Bruins in 1957. He reportedly received a $50,000 contract offer from the Bruins after scoring a goal against the New York Rangers in a preseason exhibition game as well as making five appearances for the Rangers Quebec Aces minor league team. However, Tumba turned down the offer as he would no longer have been eligible to play amateur hockey for the Swedish national team.

As a player:
1950–63: 8-time Swedish Champion (1954, 55, 58, 59, 60, 61, 62, 63)
1952: Olympic bronze, Oslo, Norway.
1953: World Champion, Zurich-Basel, Switzerland.
1954: World Championship Bronze, Stockholm, Sweden
1956: Olympic 5th place, Cortina, Italy.
1957: Test player for Boston Bruins. He was offered a contract, but turned it down, since he then would have become ineligible to play for the Swedish national team.
1957: World Champion, Moscow, USSR (also nominated best forward.)
1958: World Championship Bronze, Oslo, Norway.
1960: Olympic 5th place, Squaw Valley, USA.
1962: World Champion, Colorado Springs, USA (also nominated best forward.)
1963: World Championship Silver, Stockholm, Sweden
1964: Olympic Silver, Innsbruck, Austria.
1965: World Championship Bronze, Tampere, Rauma, Finland.
1989: Nominated the best Swedish ice hockey player throughout time.

Ice hockey projects:
1955: Inventor of the first hockey helmet, the SPAPS helmet.
1957: Founder of the Swedish ice hockey school on TV and the first ice hockey tournament for children, TV-pucken.

Football

In the mid-50s Tumba played for Djurgårdens IF, the team which he also became Swedish Champions with. He also represented the Swedish national team. He played one game for the national team (against Norway, 16 September 1956).

Honours

Club
Djurgårdens IF
Allsvenskan: 1959

Golf
After a successful career in ice hockey and football, Tumba dedicated himself to golf as a player, golf course designer and ambassador of the sport. Tumba is widely recognized as an important, maybe the most important, person for introducing golf as a widely spread sport in Sweden.

Having been introduced to the game of golf for the very first time, being over the age of 30, he reached a scratch handicap in 1970, at 39 years of age, when he, representing Stockholm Golf Club, also won the Scandinavian International Amateur Match-play Championship (one of three major amateur tournaments in Scandinavia at the time) and was selected, as one of the four best amateur players in the country, to the Swedish national team at the 1970 Eisenhower Trophy in Madrid, Spain.

He turned professional the following year and in 1974, he qualified, as one of the two best professionals in the country, to represent Sweden at the 1974 World Cup in Caracas, Venezuela.

However, concerning golf in Sweden, he is not firstly remembered for his record as a player, but for his contributions to popularizing the game and putting Sweden on the map of the world of golf. He toured around in Sweden as the main attraction in inaugurations and anniversaries at golf clubs, showing his popular golf clinic, playing exhibition matches and drawing attention in media and among people, who not formerly did know about the game.

His successful efforts to organize exhibitions in Sweden with Arnold Palmer in 1968 and Jack Nicklaus in 1969, was followed by the professional invitation tournament Volvo Open, which took place in Sweden in 1970 and 1971. In 1973 the Scandinavian Enterprise Open tournament was established, with Tumba as its founder, and it soon became one of the richest ones on the European Tour.

During the period of time for Tumbas golf career, the number of members in Swedish golf clubs increased 50 times, from around 12,000 at the beginning of the 1960s to approximately 600,000 in the middle of the 1990s.

Golf awards

In 1978, Tumba was, by the Swedish Golf Federation, awarded the Golden Club, the highest award for contributions to Swedish golf, as the first recipient.

In 1985 he received The Merit Sign in Gold by the Swedish PGA.

On the 100th anniversary of the Swedish Golf Federation in 2004, he was named the most influential person in the history of golf in that country, ahead of people such as all-time women's golf great Annika Sörenstam.

On 4 June 2022, Tumba was the seventh person to be inducted in the newly founded Swedish Golf Hall of Fame.

Golf projects
1967: Tumba Golf Center, the first indoor driving range in Sweden. Founder/Designer
1969: Founded the Colgate Cup, Sweden's major golf tournament for children up to 15 years of age
1973: Founder and President (for 15 years) of the Scandinavian Enterprise Open, one of the richest tournaments on the European Tour at the time
1977: Founder and President (for 3 years) of the European Open tournament on the European Tour.
1978: Ullna Golf Club, (venue of the Scandinavian Enterprise Open 5 times, 1983–87 and the 1988 Eisenhower Trophy). Golf course designer/Project Leader.
1987: Tumba Golf Club Moscow (now called Moscow City Club) the first golf course in the former Soviet Union, located in central Moscow close to the Swedish Embassy. Founder/Designer.
1988: Österåker Golf Club, two 18-hole courses (venue for the Ladies European Tour Compaq Open and Swedish Golf Tour tournaments)
1988: Officially introduced the game of golf in the former Soviet Union and founded the first golf school there.
1995: Founded the World Golfers Championship, a yearly amateur golf tournament in many countries, played by thousands of golfers around the world.
1998: Tumba Kävlinge Golf for All, Löddeköpinge. A new way of golf course design and management, with goal to benefit juniors and the general golf mass.
2004: Named as the most influential person in the history of golf in Sweden.

Amateur wins
1970 Scandinavian International Amateur Match-play Championship
1970 Söderhamn 72-hole Tournament

Team appearances
Amateur
Eisenhower Trophy (representing Sweden): 1970

Professional
World Cup (representing Sweden): 1974

Miscellaneous
1957–61: Own radio program, the Tumba Hour.
1959: Held water ski shows all across Sweden.
1981: Founded the Tumba Stipendium (grant) for handicapped sportsmen, that amongst other things gave Lev Yashin a hip joint replacement in Sweden.
1987: Founder of the motto "Sport Promotes Friendship and Business", supported by eminent sportsmen, politicians, artists, etc. Examples are Pelé, Sean Connery, Seve Ballesteros and Boris Yeltsin.
1989: Received the Royal Medal from HM King Carl Gustaf for his outstanding sport achievements.
2006: Founded the Sven Tumba Education Fund, Sport for Education, a charity together with AstraZeneca aiming to eradicate illiteracy.

Tumba also wrote numerous books: Tumba says it all, Tumba's hockey school (translated into three languages), as well as My rich life (the naked truth).

Personal life
Tumba was the son of engineer Torsten Johansson and his German-born wife Greta, née Kruse. He was survived by his wife Mona (née Nessim, b. 1941) and their four sons, Tommie, born 1962, Johan, born 1964, Stefan, born 1970 and Daniel, born 1982. Both Tommie and Johan became golf professionals. Johan previously played on the European Tour and finished tied 13th in the 1989 Scandinavian Enterprise Open and later became a successful professional long driving competitor.

For most of his retirement, Sven Tumba and his wife lived in West Palm Beach, Florida, returning to Sweden summers.

Death
He died on 1 October 2011 after being on the Danderyd Hospital for three months due to an infection in the hip. At the time of his death, he was both a Swedish and an American citizen, but not registered as living in Sweden. He had the ambition to become that before his death, but quickly became too weak to manage necessary formality. He was subsequently honored prior to the Swedish hockey league Elitserien games that were played that day, with a one-minute silence. His body was buried at the Engelbrekt Church in Östermalm, Stockholm, on 20 October 2011. Approximately 500 friends and relatives arrived at the church to leave flowers and honour Sven Tumba.

References

External links

A to Z Encyclopedia of Ice Hockey
Swedish Hockey, Historical World Championships
Swedish Golf Magazine
Education Fund, About Sven Tumba
Global Golf Ltd.
Sven Tumba stats at EliteProspects.com

1931 births
2011 deaths
Allsvenskan players
Association football wingers
Deaths from cancer in Sweden
Deaths from prostate cancer
Djurgårdens IF Fotboll players
Djurgårdens IF Hockey players
Ice hockey players at the 1952 Winter Olympics
Ice hockey players at the 1956 Winter Olympics
Ice hockey players at the 1960 Winter Olympics
Ice hockey players at the 1964 Winter Olympics
IIHF Hall of Fame inductees
Medalists at the 1952 Winter Olympics
Medalists at the 1964 Winter Olympics
Olympic bronze medalists for Sweden
Olympic ice hockey players of Sweden
Olympic medalists in ice hockey
Olympic silver medalists for Sweden
People from Tumba, Sweden
Ice hockey people from Stockholm
Swedish footballers
Swedish ice hockey centres
Swedish male golfers